Sybil Trent (September 22, 1926 – June 5, 2000) was an American actress in the era of old-time radio.

Early years
Trent was born September 22, 1926, in Brooklyn, New York. She was an honor graduate of Public School 17 in the Bronx, New York City.

Career
At age 6, Trent was host of Baby Sybil Elaine and Her Kiddie Revue. Later, she played Thelma in the serial As the Twig Is Bent and was assistant to the host on the children's game show The March of Games. Her longest-running role was that of host of the children's program Let's Pretend from 1935 to 1954. She played Countess Marla Darnell in Stella Dallas, and she had roles in Under Arrest, David Harum, Front Page Farrell, Gang Busters and The Story of Phyllis Wheatley.

Trent debuted on Broadway as a child, riding an elephant in the musical Jumbo (1935) at the Hippodrome Theatre.

Trent's film career began when she was in a short film at age . She went on to be under contract at Warner Bros., performing as a singer and dancer in more than two dozen short films for that studio. She later worked at RKO Pictures in feature films such as Keep 'Em Rolling (1934) and The People's Enemy (1935).

She also worked as casting director for the Young & Rubicam advertising agency from 1973 to 1994.

Personal life and death
Trent was married to Andrew Nieporent. They had two children. She died of lymphoma at her home in Manhattan, New York, on June 5, 2000, at age 73.

References

2000 deaths
1926 births
20th-century American actresses
Actresses from New York City
American child actresses
American film actresses
American radio actresses
American stage actresses
Broadway theatre people